Aiviekste hydroelectric power station is the first hydroelectric power station constructed in Latvia.  It is located on the Aiviekste River. The power station was commissioned in 1925 and until 1938 it was the largest in Latvia.  The power station was decommissioned in 1969; however, in 1988 it was decided to restore it. In 1993, the power station restarted power generation.

The power station has total capacity of 0.8 MW. In 2007, it generated 3GWh of electricity.  The power station is operated by Latvenergo.

See also

References

Hydroelectric power stations in Latvia